The year 2001 is the seventh year in the history of Fighting Network Rings, a mixed martial arts promotion based in Japan. In 2001 Fighting Network Rings held 15 events beginning with, Rings Holland: Heroes Live Forever.

Title fights

Events list

Rings Holland: Heroes Live Forever

Rings Holland: Heroes Live Forever was an event held on January 28, 2001, at The Vechtsebanen Sport Hall in Utrecht, Netherlands.

Results

Rings: King of Kings 2000 Final

Rings: King of Kings 2000 Final was an event held on February 24, 2001, at The Ryogoku Kokugikan Sumo Arena in Tokyo, Japan.

Results

Rings USA: Battle of Champions

Rings USA: Battle of Champions was an event held on March 17, 2001, at The Harveys Casino Hotel in Council Bluffs, Iowa.

Results

Rings: Battle Genesis Vol. 7

Rings: Battle Genesis Vol. 7 was an event held on March 20, 2001, at The Differ Ariake Arena in Tokyo, Japan.

Results

Rings Russia: Russia vs. Bulgaria

Rings Russia: Russia vs. Bulgaria was an event held on April 6, 2001, at The Yekaterinburg Sports Palace in Yekaterinburg, Russia.

Results

Rings: World Title Series 1

Rings: World Title Series 1 was an event held on April 20, 2001, at The Yoyogi National Stadium Gym 2 in Yoyogi National Stadium Gym 2.

Results

Rings Lithuania: Bushido Rings 2

Rings Lithuania: Bushido Rings 2 was an event held on May 8, 2001, at The Vilnius Palace of Concerts and Sports in Vilnius, Lithuania.

Results

Rings Holland: No Guts, No Glory

Rings Holland: No Guts, No Glory was an event held on June 10, 2001, at The Sport Hall Zuid in Amsterdam, North Holland, Netherlands.

Results

Rings: World Title Series 2

Rings: World Title Series 2 was an event held on June 15, 2001, at The Yokohama Cultural Gymnasium in Kanagawa, Japan.

Results

Rings: 10th Anniversary

Rings: 10th Anniversary was an event held on August 11, 2001, at Ariake Coliseum in Tokyo, Japan.

Results

Rings: Battle Genesis Vol. 8

Rings: Battle Genesis Vol. 8 was an event held on September 21, 2001, at Korakuen Hall in Tokyo, Japan.

Results

Rings: World Title Series 4

Rings: World Title Series 4 was an event held on October 20, 2001, at The Yoyogi National Stadium Gym 2 in Tokyo, Japan.

Results

Rings Lithuania: Bushido Rings 3

Rings Lithuania: Bushido Rings 3 was an event held on November 10, 2001, at The Vilnius Palace of Concerts and Sports in Vilnius, Lithuania.

Results

Rings Holland: Some Like It Hard

Rings Holland: Some Like It Hard was an event held on December 2, 2001, at The Vechtsebanen Sport Hall in Utrecht, Netherlands.

Results

Rings: World Title Series 5

Rings: World Title Series 5 was an event held on December 21, 2001, at The Yokohama Cultural Gymnasium in Kanagawa, Japan.

Results

See also 
 Fighting Network Rings
 List of Fighting Network Rings events

References

Fighting Network Rings events
2001 in mixed martial arts